René 41 is a nickel-based high temperature alloy developed by General Electric. It retains high strength in the   temperature range. It is used in jet engine and missile components, and other applications that require high strength at extreme temperatures. René 41 is considered a nickel alloy based upon its chemical composition.

René 41 was used to create the outer shell of the Mercury space capsule, due to its ability to retain high strength at very high temperatures.

References

External links
 Technical data

Nickel alloys
Superalloys
Aerospace materials
Refractory metals